"Beep Me 911" is a song recorded by American rapper and singer Missy "Misdemeanor" Elliott, featuring vocals by R&B trio 702 and rapper Magoo. It was written and composed by Elliott, Melvin Barcliff and Tim "Timbaland" Mosley for her debut album Supa Dupa Fly (1997) and released as the album's third single in 1998.

The lyrics describe Elliott insisting that, if her lover intends to leave her, he should tell her so before going, by any means necessary.

Music video
The video premiered in February 1998 and starts at a pink dollhouse where Elliott is wearing a yellow sparking dress dancing, along with the girls of 702 in the background while singing their verses. In another scene, other dolls are in a big cage dancing with Elliott.A yellow luxury sports car pulls up near the dollhouse and two male dolls wearing tuxedos and pompadours entered . They are seduced and enticed by the girls.However once Elliot appears and the male dolls realize that it's a set-up, the male dolls make an escape out,and sped away. But only to be crushed by a giant foot in high heel stilettoes ( played by costume designer June Ambrose ).The video ends with Elliot seductively blowing a kiss.

Formats and track listings
These are the formats and track listings of major single-releases of "Beep Me 911."

U.S. 12" promo single 
Side A
"Beep Me 911" (Album Version) - 4:58
"Beep Me 911" (Instrumental) - 4:57
Side B
"Beep Me 911" (Ganja Kru Remix) - 6:27
"Beep Me 911" (Acapella) - 4:16

U.S. promo single 
Side A
"Beep Me 911" (Radio Version)
"Beep Me 911" (LP Version Dirty)
Side B
"Beep Me 911" (Instrumental)
"Beep Me 911" (Acapella)

12" remix promo 
Side A
"Beep Me 911" (Remix) (Main Version) - 4:20
"Beep Me 911" (Remix) (Radio Version) - 4:05
Side B
"Beep Me 911" (Remix) (Instrumental) - 4:17
"Beep Me 911" (Remix) (Acapella) - 3:51

12" single 
Side A
"Beep Me 911" (Jason Nevins Beeps Missy Elliott 911 - 12" Version) - 6:03
"Beep Me 911" (Radio Version) - 4:24
Side B
"Beep Me 911" (Remix - Main Version) - 4:20
"Beep Me 911" (Ganja Kru Remix) - 6:27

UK CD Maxi-single 
"Beep Me 911" (Radio Version) - 4:24
"Beep Me 911" (Jason Nevins Beeps Missy Elliott 911 Radio Remix) - 3:55
"Beep Me 911" (Jason Nevins Beeps Missy Elliott 911 Extended Remix) - 5:02
"Beep Me 911" (Ganja Kru Remix) - 6:27

German 12" Promo 
Side A
"Beep Me 911" (Jason Nevins Beeps Missy Elliott 911 12" Club Version) - 6:03
Side B
"Beep Me 911" (Jason Nevins Beeps Missy Elliott 911 12" Radio Version) - 6:03
"Beep Me 911" (US Radio Version) - 4:24

Charts

References

External links
 Missy-Elliott.com — official site

1998 songs
702 (group) songs
Missy Elliott songs
Song recordings produced by Timbaland
Songs written by Missy Elliott
Songs written by Timbaland
Songs written by Melvin Barcliff